Priestner is a surname. Notable people with the surname include:

Cathy Priestner (born 1956), Canadian speed skater
Colin Priestner (born 1984), Canadian hockey executive, singer-songwriter, and athlete
John Priestner (born 1958), Canadian football player